Wattah Wattah Festival or Basaan Festival (literally: dousing of water) is the feast of St. John the Baptist, patron saint of San Juan, Metro Manila, and of many other communities throughout the Philippines, held every 24 June.

Custom

Filipinos commemorate the birth of Saint John, who cleansed and prepared the people for the coming of Jesus Christ by baptizing them with water. Along with the birthday of the Blessed Virgin Mary, John the Baptist’s birthday is the only one celebrated; most other saints are remembered on the day of their death or some other important date.

 quotes Saint John as saying:

Children and grown-ups alike line up the streets and generously douse passersby or unsuspecting commuters and visitors with water, with the traditional basaan (wetting of water) or buhusan (dousing of water)- supposedly to remind them of their baptism. They also enjoy engaging in water wars and other wet games using dippers, pails, hoses and even water pistols. Older persons my fill their ancient coconut shells with perfumed water to sprinkle on passersby.  In rural areas, people take a swim at the beach, in a nearby river, or at a local spring, believing that a little exposure to water today, even just a sprinkle or splash, will bring God's blessings.  This popular custom is practiced as they recall San Juan's life and mission. That is why in some places, passing buses, cars, and jeeps become the targets of water splashed and thrown about with reckless gusto.

Filipinos from different parts of the country celebrate this feast in various ways. Four of the most popular celebrations can be witnessed in Balayan, Batangas, Calumpit, Bulacan, Aliaga, Nueva Ecija, Cavite City, Cavite and in San Juan, Metro Manila.

References

June observances
Festivals in Metro Manila
Saint John's Day